Dorothy Joy Kinney Chambers (born September 16, 1901, Albuquerque, New Mexico -December 3, 2001 Fort Collins, Colorado) was a missionary physician who treated American military inmates at the Santo Tomas Internment Camp.

Early life  and education
Chambers’ parents were Edwin Bruce McKinney, a Baptist minister, and Mabel E. Alger Kinney.

Before Chambers graduated as salutatorian of her class at the University of Colorado School of Medicine (Class of 1926), she earned her BS from Denison University in 1923.  She went to northeast India for ten years after graduating to work with the poor.

While there, she met Fred Chambers who was a widowed Baptist minister and they married in 1936.  They moved to the Philippines in 1939 as WWII was starting in Europe and Chambers began to work at a mission hospital. When Japan took over the Philippines, Dorothy, Fred and their two young children were sent to internment camps at an Iloilo prison and the campus of University of Santo Tomas in Manila. They were there from April 1942 until February 1945.

They returned to Colorado after the war living in Boulder and Fort Collins. After her husband died, she would tell her story around the country on the lecture circuit.

Publications about Chambers
 Pullen L. Dorothy Kinney Chambers: a most valiant woman. Am Baptist Q. 1999;18(4):389-95. PMID 21174919.
Schwaner, Mary and Bobbi Chambers Hawk: Courage in a White Coat

References

1901 births
People from Albuquerque, New Mexico
University of Colorado School of Medicine alumni
20th-century American physicians
21st-century American women physicians
21st-century American physicians
Denison University alumni
Physicians from New Mexico
Baptist missionaries from the United States
Baptist missionaries in India
Baptist missionaries in the Philippines
2001 deaths